Ramon Leroy Poulter (10 March 1929 – 14 June 1999) was an Australian rules football player who played in the Victorian Football League between 1946 and 1956 for the Richmond Football Club. He was then the captain-coach of Castlemaine in the Bendigo Football League.

The son of Collingwood player Joseph Leroy Poulter (1902–1947) and Vera Daphne Poulter (1905–1971), nee Roy, Ramon Leroy Poulter was born at Greensborough in March 1929.

References

External links
 
 

1929 births
1999 deaths
Richmond Football Club players
Castlemaine Football Club players
Greensborough Football Club players
Australian rules footballers from Melbourne
People from Greensborough, Victoria